Paul Allan Oscher (February 26, 1947 – April 18, 2021) was an American blues singer, songwriter, and instrumentalist.  Primarily a harmonica player, he was the first permanent white member of Muddy Waters' band.

Background
Oscher was born in Brooklyn, New York. He was married to the Pulitzer Prize-winning playwright, Suzan-Lori Parks, from 2001 to 2011.

Career
He first began playing harmonica at the age of 12. His career as a musician began at the age of 15 when he played for the musician Little Jimmy Mae.  He named John Lee Williamson as a major influence.

Oscher met Muddy Waters in the mid-1960s. After Big Walter Horton failed to show up for a gig, Oscher played harmonica as a member of the Muddy Waters Blues Band from 1967 until 1972.  He was the first white musician in Muddy's band, and lived in Muddy's house on Chicago's South Side, where Oscher shared the basement with the blues pianist Otis Spann. Oscher recorded with Muddy for Chess Records. 

After performing solo for a time in New York as "Brooklyn Slim", he toured Europe in 1976 with Louisiana Red. They both appeared at the WDR-TV music show,  Rockpalast.  During the 1990s, Oscher worked as a multi-instrumentalist, playing piano, guitar and harmonica, sometimes as a one-man band.  He recorded an album in 1995, The Deep Blues of Paul Oscher.   In 1999, he played with Big Bill Morganfield on his debut album, Rising Son. 

In 2003, Oscher was featured on harmonica, guitar and vocals on Hubert Sumlin's album, About Them Shoes, along with Keith Richards, Eric Clapton and Levon Helm. In 2006, Oscher collaborated with Mos Def and recorded the song, "Bed Stuy Parade and Funeral March", on Mos Def's album, The New Danger. In 2008, he recorded with Keb' Mo' on the soundtrack of a film about the blues, Who Do You Love?.

Death
Oscher died on April 18, 2021, in Austin, his home city for the last years of his life, after several weeks hospitalized with COVID-19 during the COVID-19 pandemic in Texas. He was 74.

Awards
2006: Blues Music Awards:
"Acoustic Artist of the Year"  
"Acoustic Album of the Year"
2000: LA Music Awards
"Best Performance by Blues Musician"

Discography
As a solo artist
Knockin' On The Devil's Door (Viceroots, 1996)
The Deep Blues Of Paul Oscher  (Blues Planet, 1996)
Living Legends Deep In The Blues (Blues Leaf, 2000)	
Alone With The Blues (Electro-Fi, 2004)
Down In The Delta (Blues Fidelity, 2005)	
Bet On The Blues (Blues Fidelity, 2010)	
Cool Cat (Blues Fidelity, 2018)

With Muddy Waters
After the Rain (Chess, 1969)
Live at Mr. Kelly's (Chess, 1971)
"Unk" in Funk (Chess, 1974)

References

External links
Official website
Biography from hohnerusa
Biography from bluesplanet
Biography from mannishboys

 

American blues singers
1947 births
2021 deaths
Musicians from Brooklyn
Harmonica blues musicians
American blues harmonica players
American blues guitarists
American male guitarists
Guitarists from New York (state)
20th-century American guitarists
20th-century American male musicians
Deaths from the COVID-19 pandemic in Texas